Ivar Tristan Lundsten (professional name: Brynjard Tristan) (born 14 June 1976) is a Norwegian bassist and songwriter, presently living in Oslo, but originally hails from the nearby municipalities of Nesodden and Jessheim.

He is mostly known for his time as bassist for the black metal-band Dimmu Borgir, from 1993 to 1996, which he left after the album Stormblåst.  In 1994-1995 Brynjard was also a member of Old Man's Child, where he was a songwriter and played bass on the band's demo In The Shades Of Life. However, he left the band just before the release of their first album.

He also used to be a writer for the Norwegian music magazine Mute.

Presently Brynjard is working on his new band, Angstkrieg, where he is the vocalist.

Discography

With Dimmu Borgir 
Inn I Evighetens Mørke, EP, Necromantic Gallery Productions, 1993
For All Tid, album, No Colours Records, 1994
Stormblåst, album, Cacophonous Records, 1996

With Old Man’s Child 
In the Shades of Life, demo, 1994, reissued as split EP with Dimmu Borgir named Sons of Satan Gather for Attack, Hammerheart Records, 1999

With Angstkrieg 
Angstkrieg, EP, self-released, 2010

References

External links
Angstkrieg website

1976 births
Living people
Dimmu Borgir members
Norwegian heavy metal bass guitarists
Norwegian male bass guitarists
Norwegian black metal musicians
Norwegian rock bass guitarists
Norwegian songwriters
People from Jessheim
People from Nesodden
21st-century Norwegian bass guitarists
Old Man's Child members